Suruk may refer to:
Şürük, Azerbaijan
Suruk, Iran
Suruc, southern Turkey